Pariolius armillatus is a species of three-barbeled catfish native to the upper Amazon basin of Brazil and Peru.  This species grows to a length of  SL and inhabits sand and gravel bottoms of creeks of relatively fast flowing water as well as sluggish waters of the same streams where aquatic vegetation is lacking. It feeds mainly on Trichoptera larvae.  It is the only recognized member of its genus.

References

Heptapteridae
Taxa named by Edward Drinker Cope
Fish of South America
Fish of Brazil
Freshwater fish of Peru
Monotypic fish genera